National Pork Producers Council v. Ross (Docket 21–468) is a pending United States Supreme Court case related to the Dormant Commerce Clause.

Background 

In 2018, California's voters approved Proposition 12, which seeks to better the treatment of pigs kept for livestock by barring the sale of pork produced in conditions that are common in the industry today. Much of the pork consumed in the state is imported from other parts of the United States, so the proposition serves to regulate the national pork industry as a whole. A group of farmers and corporations in the pork industry sued California, asserting the proposition violates the Dormant Commerce Clause. The United States District Court for the Southern District of California dismissed the lawsuit, and the United States Court of Appeals for the Ninth Circuit affirmed, in a 3–0 opinion.

The National Pork Producers Council filed a petition for a writ of certiorari.

Supreme Court 

Certiorari was granted in the case on March 28, 2022. Oral arguments were heard on October 11, 2022.

References

External links 
 

2023 in United States case law
United States Supreme Court cases
United States Supreme Court cases of the Roberts Court
United States Dormant Commerce Clause case law